John Francis Finnigan (born 29 March 1976) is an English football coach and former professional footballer.

He played as a midfielder in the Football League for Lincoln City and Cheltenham Town after starting his career with Nottingham Forest. He later had spells in Non-League for Kidderminster Harriers, Bishop's Cleeve and Shortwood United. He had a brief spell in charge of Kidderminster in 2009.

Playing career
Born in Wakefield, Finnigan began his career with Nottingham Forest however failed to make an appearance at the City Ground and was loaned out to Lincoln City for his first spell with the club in 1998. He made his first league appearance for Lincoln in April 1998 against Macclesfield Town and featured in the Imps promotion to Division Two.

On his release by Nottingham Forest, Finnigan signed permanently for Lincoln City and for the 2000–01 season he was made team captain. Finnigan missed a large chunk of the 2001–02 season with a neck injury and after four years at Sincil Bank he left the club in March 2002 to join Cheltenham Town.

In his first season with Cheltenham Town, Finnigan helped Cheltenham to promotion via the play-offs, scoring in the play-off final against Rushden & Diamonds at the Millennium Stadium, and also received the 'Player of the Season' award at Whaddon Road.

He was made captain at the club and in 2006 he signed a new two-year contract under manager John Ward to keep him at Cheltenham until the summer of 2008. Finnigan then signed a contract extension to keep him at Cheltenham until 2010 alongside striker Steven Gillespie in August 2007. Finnigan suffered an injury which kept him out of action for a year in 2007.

In the close season of 2009, Finnigan was released by Cheltenham, with the remaining one year on his contract cancelled by mutual consent, quoting 'it was time to move on'. He signed for Conference National side Kidderminster Harriers on a two-year contract.

In October 2010, he parted company with Kidderminster Harriers.

After regaining fitness at Winchcombe School he signed for Bishop's Cleeve in the Southern League, debuting in the 0–0 home draw with Stourport Swifts on 3 January 2011. However, his season was curtailed when he injured his cruciate knee ligaments in Bishop's Cleeve's 2–1 defeat at Abingdon United on 12 March 2011.

After starting the 2011–12 season with Bishop's Cleeve, Finnigan featured just a handful of times under new manager Alex Sykes as he struggled for fitness on his return from injury. Finnigan then signed for Hellenic Premier Division outfit Shortwood United in October 2011. Finnigan was part of the Shortwood United squad that reached the FA Vase quarter finals in March 2012. At the end of the 2011–12 season, Finnigan retired from playing.

Coaching career
Finnigan was appointed as temporary manager of Kidderminster Harriers on 23 December 2009 following the departure of Mark Yates to Cheltenham Town.

Personal life
Finnigan is also Sport's Development Officer at Winchcombe School, whilst also the Football Academy Manager at Kidderminster College. He very rarely turns out for local Cheltenham teams such as Winchcombe Town and Village Real.

References

External links

1976 births
Living people
Footballers from Wakefield
English footballers
Association football midfielders
Nottingham Forest F.C. players
Lincoln City F.C. players
Cheltenham Town F.C. players
Kidderminster Harriers F.C. players
English Football League players
National League (English football) players
Bishop's Cleeve F.C. players
Kidderminster Harriers F.C. managers
English football managers
Shortwood United F.C. players